Henry Clemens van de Velde (3 April 1863 – 15 October 1957) was a Belgian painter, architect, interior designer, and art theorist. Together with Victor Horta and Paul Hankar, he is considered one of the founders of Art Nouveau in Belgium. He worked in Paris with Samuel Bing, the founder of the first gallery of Art Nouveau in Paris. Van de Velde spent the most important part of his career in Germany and became a major figure in the German Jugendstil. He had a decisive influence on German architecture and design at the beginning of the 20th century.

Early life 
Van de Velde was born in Antwerp, where he studied painting under Charles Verlat at the famous Royal Academy of Fine Arts, Antwerp. He then went on to study with the painter Carolus-Duran in Paris. As a young painter he was strongly influenced by Paul Signac and Georges Seurat and soon adopted a neo-impressionist style, and pointillism. In 1889 he became a member of the Brussels-based artist group "Les XX". After Vincent van Gogh exhibited some work on the yearly exhibition of Les XX van de Velde became one of the first artists to be influenced by the Dutch painter. During this period he developed a lasting friendship with the painter Théo van Rysselberghe and the sculptor Constantin Meunier.

Career 
In 1890, van de Velde wrote that "there will be no place in the society of the future for anything which is not of use to everyone."

In 1892, he abandoned painting, devoting his time to the arts of decoration and interior design (silver and goldsmith's trade, chinaware and cutlery, fashion design, carpet and fabric design). His meeting with Maria Sèthe, his future wife, was instrumental in this change. They collaborated on a number of projects together, including designing wallpapers and female clothing. Their first house, Bloemenwerf in Uccle, was van de Velde's first attempt at architecture and was inspired by the British Arts and Crafts Movement. Its exterior closely resembled the Red House of William Morris. Maria Sèthe designed the garden surrounding the house.

Henry van de Velde also designed interiors and furniture for the influential art gallery "L'Art Nouveau" of Samuel Bing in Paris in 1895, the shop from which Art Nouveau took its name. He participated in Bing's pavilion at the Paris Universal Exposition of 1900 and showed his own work.

Van de Velde was strongly influenced by John Ruskin and William Morris's English Arts and Crafts movement and he was one of the first architects or furniture designers to apply curved lines in an abstract style, rather than based on nature.

Van de Velde's design work became known in Germany through periodicals such as Innen-Dekoration. As a result, he received commissions for interior designs in Berlin. Around the turn of the century, he designed Villa Leuring in the Netherlands, and Villa Esche in Chemnitz, two works that show his Art Nouveau style in architecture. He also designed the interior of the Folkwang Museum in Hagen (today the building houses the Karl Ernst Osthaus-Museum) and the Nietzsche Archive in Weimar.

In 1899, he settled in Weimar, Germany, where he was employed as artistic advisor to William Ernest, Grand Duke Saxe-Weimar-Eisenach. In 1907, he established the Grand-Ducal School of Arts and Crafts, under the patronage of the Grand Duke. Van de Velde designed the school's building and was the school's first director. He stepped down during World War I due to his Belgian citizenship and suggested that architect Walter Gropius succeed him. In 1919, the School merged with the Weimar Art Academy to form the famous modernist art school, Bauhaus.

Although a Belgian, van de Velde played an important role in the German Jugendstil.

In 1907, he co-founded the German Werkbund, an association to help improve and promote German design by establishing close relations between industry and designers. He would oppose Hermann Muthesius at the Werkbund meeting of 1914 and their debate would mark the history of Modern Architecture. Van de Velde called for the upholding of the individuality of artists while Hermann Muthesius called for standardization as a key to development. Van de Velde was a proponent of incorporating logic into all facets of design, taking inspiration from engineers application of reason and calculation.

During World War I, Van de Velde, as a foreign national, was obliged to leave Weimar (although on good terms with the Weimar government) and returned to his native Belgium. Later, he lived in Switzerland and in the Netherlands where he designed the Kröller-Müller Museum in Otterlo. In 1925 he was appointed professor at the Ghent University Institute of Art History and Archaeology, where he lectured architecture and applied arts from 1926 to 1936. He was instrumental in founding in Brussels, in 1926, today's renowned architecture and visual arts school , under the name of "."

Modernism 

He continued his practice in architecture and design, which had demarcated itself significantly from the Art Nouveau phase, whose popularity was by 1910 in decline. During this period, he mentored the great Belgian architect, Victor Bourgeois. In 1933 he was commissioned to design the new building for the university library (the renowned Boekentoren). Construction started in 1936, but the work would not be completed until the end of the Second World War. For budget reasons, the eventual construction did not entirely match the original design. For instance, the reading room floor was executed in marble instead of the black rubber Van de Velde originally intended. He was also involved in the construction of the Ghent University Hospital.

He died, aged 94, in Zürich.

Auctions and exhibitions 
12 October 2005 a teapot designed by van de Velde made €170,000 at a public auction at the Brussels Beaux-Arts auction house – eleven times the opening bid.  It is a teapot on a chafing dish, with a wooden handle, resting on an oval basis and made of silver-plated brass.  During an Art Nouveau and Design exhibition at the Brussels Cinquantenaire Museum ("Jubilee Park Museum") in 2005, Henry van de Velde's tea set, two china plates and a silver dish were badly damaged in an unfortunate accident. The silver candle stand remained unharmed. The pieces had been given on temporary loan by Krefeld's Kaiser Wilhelm Museum, the Museum für Angewandte Kunst in Cologne and a private collector.

.

.

Selected works 

 1895–96: "Bloemenwerf", Van de Velde's first private residence, in Uccle, Belgium
 1895: Interior decoration of Siegfried Bing's art Gallery "Maison de l'art nouveau" in Paris, France
 1898 : Monument Frédéric de Merode, Brussels, Belgium 
 1900–02: Interior of the Folkwang Museum in Hagen, Germany
 1902–03, 1911 (extension): "Villa Esche" in Chemnitz, Germany
 1903: Extension and interior decoration of the Nietzsche Archive in Weimar, Germany
 1906–07: Clubhouse of the  "Chemnitzer Lawn-Tennis-Club" in Chemnitz (demolished)
 1907–08: "Hohenhof", Mansion for Karl Ernst Osthaus in Hagen, Germany
 1907–08: "Haus Hohe Pappeln", Van de Velde's private residence in Weimar, Germany
 1909–11: "Ernst-Abbe-Denkmal", Memorial for Ernst Abbe in Jena (in collaboration with the sculptors Max Klinger and Constantin Meunier)
 1912–13: Palace for Graf Dürckheim in Weimar, Germany
 1913–14: "Werkbund-Theater", Theatre at the Deutsche Werkbund exhibition in Cologne, Germany
 1913–14: "Villa Schulenburg" in Gera, Germany
 1913–14: Wohnhaus für den Fabrikanten Dr. Theo Koerner in Chemnitz, Germany
 1927–28: "La Nouvelle Maison", Van de Velde's private residence in Tervuren, Belgium
 1929 : "Wolfers House" in Ixelles (Brussels), Belgium
 1929–31: Home for the elderly of the 'Minna und James Heinemann-Stiftung' in Hannover, Germany
 1933–35: Polyclinic and "Villa Landing" for Dr. Adriaan Martens in "Astene" near Ghent, Belgium
 1933–38: Library of Ghent University with "Boekentoren" in Ghent, Belgium
 1936–42: "Technische School", School building in Leuven, Belgium
 1937: Belgian Pavilion at the 1937 Paris Exposition
 1937: "Station Blankenberge", Train station in Blankenberge
 1939: Belgian Building for the 1939 New York World's Fair

References

Bibliography
 .
 .
  [English influence on H.van de Velde, Dahlia Wallpaper].
 Léon Ploegaerts et Pierre Puttemans, L'œuvre architecturale de Henry van de Velde, Laval, 1987.
 Richard Hollis, Henry van de Velde. The Artist as Designer. From Art Nouveau to Modenism. Occasional Papers, 2019.
 Klaus-Jürgen Sembach, Henry van de Velde : ein europäischer Künstler seiner Zeit, Köln : Wienand Verlag, 1992, ISBN 3-87909-314-8

External links 

 
 
 .
 .
 .
 .
  and building blog on the renovation.
 .
 .
 On his 150th birthday, Google dedicated its home page to van de Velde.
 Royal Museums of Art and History, Brussels, Belgium: exhibition  from 13 September 2013 to 12 January 2014.

1863 births
1957 deaths
Artists from Antwerp
19th-century Belgian painters
19th-century Belgian male artists
Architects from Antwerp
Art Nouveau architects
Arts and Crafts movement
Expressionist architects
Modernist architects
Art Nouveau designers
Art Nouveau painters
Henry van de Velde buildings
Academic staff of Bauhaus University, Weimar